Kamøya (or Store Kamøya) is an uninhabited island in Hammerfest Municipality in Troms og Finnmark county, Norway. The  island is north of the large island of Sørøya and just a little south of Lille Kamøya. The island is home to many bird cliff nesting areas.

See also
List of islands of Norway

References

Hammerfest
Uninhabited islands of Norway
Islands of Troms og Finnmark